Werner Beierwaltes (* 8 May 1931, Klingenberg am Main; † 22 February 2019, Würzburg) was a German academic best known as a historian of philosophy. His most important areas of specialization were Neoplatonism and German Idealism. He was an Emeritus Professor of Philosophy at the Ludwig Maximilian University of Munich.

His many books include Proklos: Grundzuge seiner Metaphysik, Denken des Einen: Studien zur neuplatonischen Philosophie und ihrer Wirkungsgeschichte, Eriugena: Grundzuge seines Denkens, Platonismus im Christentum, and Platonismus und Idealismus. He was among the original Editorial Advisors of the scholarly journal Dionysius, in which English-language examples of his writings may be found. He was also a member of the Editorial Board of the International Journal of Philosophical Studies, Quaestio, and Anuario Filosófico.

He was a Member of the Bavarian Academy of Sciences and Humanities from 1986 and a Member of the Royal Irish Academy. He was in addition admitted to the Order of Merit of the Federal Republic of Germany and the Bavarian Order of Merit.

References

External links 
 Official Website
 Dionysius
 The International Journal of Philosophical Studies
 Anuario Filosófico
 The Legacy of Neoplatonism in F. W. J. Schelling's Thought
 Epekeina: A Remark on Heidegger's Reception of Plato

Academic staff of the Ludwig Maximilian University of Munich
Members of the Bavarian Academy of Sciences
Members of the Royal Irish Academy
Ludwig Maximilian University of Munich alumni
Officers Crosses of the Order of Merit of the Federal Republic of Germany
1931 births
2019 deaths
German male writers